The Germa Museum is an archaeological museum located in Fezzan, Libya. It contains old objects excavated at Germa, the seat of the ancient Garamantian Kingdom. The Garamantian Kingdom flourished between 400 BC and 600 AD.

See also 

Capitoline Temple
Apollonia Museum
Ghadames Museum
List of museums in Libya

References 

Museums with year of establishment missing
Archaeological museums in Libya
History of Fezzan